Vicente López Portaña, OIC (September 19, 1772July 22, 1850) was a Spanish painter, considered one of the best portrait painters of his time.

Early life
Vicente López Portaña was born in Valencia on September 19, 1772.  His parents were Cristóbal López Sanchordi and Manuela Portaña Meer. Vicente López began formally studying painting in Valencia at the age of thirteen, he was a disciple of father Antonio de Villanueva, a Franciscan friar, and he studied at the Academy of San Carlos in his native city. He was seventeen when he won first prize in drawing and coloring receiving a scholarship to study in the prestigious Academia Real de Bellas Artes de San Fernando in Madrid. For the following three years in Madrid, he apprenticed with the Valencian painter, Mariano Salvador Maella. Vicente López returned to Valencia in 1794 and subsequently became vice-director of painting at the Academy where he had studied as a boy. In 1795 he married Maria Piquer, they had two sons: Bernardo and Luis, who were also painters, following their father's style but with little accomplishments. In 1801 López was named President of the Academy of San Carlos.

Court painter

When king Charles IV visited the city of Turia in 1802, the king appointed him an honorary court painter at the same time he gave him some commissions that he executed successfully. He was already well known and regarded when in 1814 López was called to the court of Ferdinand VII, the Spanish king, who appointed him official court painter and received a royal appointment. Shortly thereafter he succeeded Goya as Royal Court Painter during the reign of Ferdinand VII, who also appointed him as drawing teacher of his second wife, Maria Isabella of Portugal, and later of his third wife, Maria Josepha Amalia of Saxony. In 1817 he was named President of the Real Academia de Bellas Artes de San Fernando.

Vicente López was a prolific painter executing many religious, allegorical, historic and mythological scenes, but he specialized in portraits. During his long career he painted nearly every notable person in Spain during the first half of the 1800s.

In 1826, López painted a portrait of Francisco Goya when the famous master visited the court from Bordeaux, where the Aragonese painter was then living. Goya was then 80 and would die two years later. It was said that Goya got bored posing for his colleague who was very meticulous and a stickler for detail, and that for this reason the portrait is inferior to others by López. However, for this precise reason, and because of the strong personality of the model this is one of López's most lively and best-known works.

Vicente López spent the remainder of his life in Madrid painting portraits of statesmen, academics, and other important figures, as well as dramatic and emotional religious subjects. When he died, in Madrid, he was court painter of Queen Isabella II. He was seventy eight years old.

Style 
Vicente López was a Neo-classicist painter but he retained certain traces of the Rococo style. He had the Neo-classical emphasis on masterly drawing, though with less rigidity. López is considered the best Spanish painter of his time, second only to Francisco José de Goya y Lucientes. One of his rivals was Agustín Esteve Marqués.

López's style is dominated by the influence of Anton Raphael Mengs and the Academicism, and he was unaffected by romanticism popular at the end of his career. López was very skilled in drawing and using the brush, but he did not achieve the level of genius that Goya did. His best works are probably his drawings and small-scale paintings.

References
Vicente López Portaña (1772–1850). Su vida, su arte, su obra.(pinturas, dibujos y estampas), by José Luis Diez García, Alfonso E Pérez Sánchez - 1994
Vicente López by E. M Aguilera

 Scholarly articles in English about Vicente López Portaña both in web and PDF @ the Spanish Old Masters Gallery

External links

Spanish people of English descent
Spanish people of Dutch descent
Spanish people of Flemish descent
1772 births
1850 deaths
People from Valencia
18th-century Spanish painters
18th-century Spanish male artists
Spanish male painters
19th-century Spanish painters
19th-century Spanish male artists
Painters from the Valencian Community
Court painters